Kyle Fiat (born March 14, 1983 in Salt Lake City, UT) is professional lacrosse player who plays for the Philadelphia Wings in the National Lacrosse League and the Washington Bayhawks in Major League Lacrosse. Outside of lacrosse, Fiat is a physical education teacher at Dulaney High School near Baltimore, Maryland . He extravagantly dominates plyometrics and spreads his knowledge of the activity with his many weight training students.

Collegiate career
Fiat attended the Towson University where he played under Defensive Coach and fellow Philadelphia Wings player, Shawn Nadelen.  Fiat started college at Utah State University where he played club lacrosse before transferring to Towson University for two years and making the team as a walk-on.

Professional career
Fiat signed with the Wings as a free agent on November 14, 2006.  His first NLL goal came in dramatic fashion, scoring the game-winner on March 24, 2007, with 40 seconds remaining in a Wings come from behind victory over the Chicago Shamrox.

He was drafted by the Washington Bayhawks in Round Two (12th overall) of the 2007 MLL Supplemental Draft.

Fiat was named to Team USA for the 2007 World Indoor Lacrosse Championships.

Fiat also teaches Physical Education at Dulaney High School in Timonium, MD.

Statistics

NLL

MLL

PU#GB8SCGB81775185

References

1983 births
Living people
Philadelphia Wings players
Major League Lacrosse players
Lacrosse players from Utah
Utah State University alumni
Towson Tigers men's lacrosse players
Sportspeople from Salt Lake City
Chesapeake Bayhawks players